Sympistis extremis is a moth of the family Noctuidae first described by Smith in 1890. It is found in western North America from British Columbia to Washington and Oregon. It was formerly known as Oncocnemis chorda extremis, a subspecies of Oncocnemis chorda, but was elevated to species level as Oncocnemis extremis in 1999 and transferred to the genus Sympistis in 2008.

The wingspan is 30–34 mm.

The larvae feed on Penstemon species, particularly Penstemon fruticosus.

References

extremis
Moths of North America
Moths described in 1890